Boat People SOS (BPSOS) is a 501(c)3 nonprofit organization devoted to Vietnamese-American civic and political activism. It is headquartered in Falls Church, Virginia. BPSOS' mission is to "empower, organize, and equip Vietnamese individuals and communities in their pursuit of liberty and dignity." BPSOS claims that one in 10 Vietnamese Americans has received assistance from BPSOS while still in Vietnam, on the high seas, in a refugee camp, or after arriving in the United States. Through their 17 office locations in the U.S. and two office locations in Southeast Asia, they provide a web of services to support individuals, families, and communities.

BPSOS has experienced significant growth and positive media, especially with Pamela Constable's article in The Washington Post on 2008 October 21. On 2008 December 6, BPSOS volunteer and former (1996-2002) board member Anh "Joseph" Cao became the first Vietnamese-American to be elected to Congress.

History

Origin
Founded in San Diego and Songkla Camp, Thailand as Boat People S.O.S. Committee, in their early days they conducted voluntary rescue-at-sea missions, rescuing over 3,000 boat people. Later, in response to pirate attacks against Vietnamese boat people in the waters of Thailand and Malaysia, they collaborated with the Thai Royal Navy to fight pirates and bring refugees to safety.

Early Development
Under the Vietnamese communists, people sought ways to escape but were not welcome anywhere. According to the report of United Nations High Commissioner For Refugees, 1/3 of Vietnamese boat people died at sea by killing, storms, illness and food shortage. A total of approximately 250,000 men, women, and children of all ages. Boats were being pushed back out to the seas, and those few survivors who reached shores were put into detention centers.

In response to major shifts in US and international policies toward the Vietnamese boat people, they moved our headquarters to Northern Virginia to concentrate on advocacy. Rising to the new challenge of saving the last boat people, BPSOS sent lawyers to asylum countries through its Legal Assistance for Vietnamese Asylum Seekers (LAVAS) project and successfully advocated for policy changes, which resulted in resettlement of 18,000 former boat people after repatriation.

Present Status
When most boat people were either repatriated or resettled, they shifted their focus to domestic programs for Vietnamese refugees and immigrants in communities all across America. In 2005 and the years that followed, the Katrina Aid Today (KAT) recovery program was a catalyst for their work in the Vietnamese-American communities of the Gulf Coast. As a direct result of working with KAT, a national consortium of organizations under the guidance of the United Methodist Committee on Relief, they founded branches in Bayou La Batre, New Orleans, and Biloxi. Many of the tens of thousands of Vietnamese Americans living in those areas were poor even before Katrina struck. Working as case managers through KAT, they boosted many families from misery to self-sufficiency through programs to rebuild everything from homes and bank accounts to social networks. In the course of more than two years following Katrina, the BPSOS KAT teams assisted close to 4,000 families, securing them $16.5 million in assistance, placing 850 into homes, and referring 265 to jobs; built capacity for 12 faith-based and community organizations to serve hurricane victims, including raising over $200,000 to support their activities; and established a system to disseminate news and information directly to some 5,000 Vietnamese households via the press, radio, and television.

International Initiatives

CAMSA

Origin
In February 2008, responding to an alarming level of human trafficking in Southeast Asia, BPSOS, in partnership with the International Society for Human Rights, the Vietnamese Canadian Federation, and the U.S. Committee to Protect Vietnamese Workers, launched The Coalition to Abolish Modern-day Slavery in Asia (CAMSA) project. BPSOS is active in tackling the global explosion of human trafficking, especially in the realm of labor exports. Slashed wages, grueling working hours, ill-treatment, and deception are all everyday challenges faced by a new generation of Vietnamese working overseas.

Mission and Aim
CAMSA's mission is to rescue and protect trafficking victims, punish traffickers through economic and legal measures, and pressure the governments of the source and destination countries to enact and enforce anti-trafficking laws and policies. CAMSA’s anti-human trafficking campaign has three focuses:

Rescue and protect victims;
Punish traffickers through economic and legal means; and
Pressure the governments of the source and destination countries to enact and enforce anti-trafficking laws and policies.

CAMSA collaborates with other organizations to open offices in countries with a significant Vietnamese population. The purpose of these offices is to develop resources locally, and to help Vietnamese in danger of being a victim of human trafficking. In April 2008, the first CAMSA office was opened in Penang, Malaysia. So far this office has handled 30 cases of varying sizes, assisting some 3,000 guest workers. BPSOS is currently spearheading fundraising efforts to open other CAMSA offices in the region. Each individual office will have the capacity to help thousands of victims of exploitation or trafficking.

Activity

BPSOS first became involved in the issue of human trafficking through the Daewoosa Case. In 1999, over 200 Vietnamese and Chinese workers were tricked into paying thousands of dollars each in order to travel to work in a sewing factory on the island of American Samoa. Each worker was promised $408 per month for wages, plus free food and housing. However, once there, the workers were beaten, confined to the factory, barely fed, and forced to live in filthy conditions while the employer kept their travel documents. They worked hard to bring media and government attention to this case of human trafficking. After the US government prosecuted Daewoosa, BPSOS along with other service providers came to the aid of the victims. Daewoosa survivors are now legally in the US and are being helped to receive the benefits of immigration relief, health care, education, and employment assistance by our Victims of Exploitation and Trafficking Assistance (VETA) program.

More recently, in February 2008, BPSOS came to the aid of over 170 young women employed by W&D Apparel, a Taiwanese firm operating in Jordan. Fed up with being cheated out of wages and forced to work 16-hour days, the workers went on strike for several weeks. Despite the use of brutal force by factory guards and the police to break the strike, they persevered. Since then, international pressure from BPSOS, the State Department, and members of the US Congress has helped them return home, as they wished, with a measure of dignity.

As a founding member of the Coalition to Abolish Modern-day Slavery in Asia (CAMSA), BPSOS has since worked with Esquel Malaysia to successfully resolve disputes over wages and working conditions at that firm. The latest firm to receive the focus of CAMSA’s concerns is Polar Twin Advance, a high-tech firm in Penang. That case was resolved with financial assistance to the workers concerned, and their safe return home. As of Winter 2008, CAMSA has intervened in several cases, positively affecting a total of nearly 3,000 Vietnamese guest workers. With these accomplishments under their belt, they are moving forward, mindful of the key lesson learned from taking on foes like the South China Sea and Hurricane Katrina.

Defending Refugee Rights
As a continuation of their work under Legal Assistance for Vietnamese Asylum Seekers (LAVAS) in the 1990s, BPSOS continues to defend Vietnamese victims of persecution including those still in Vietnam and hundreds of Vietnamese who successfully fled to neighboring countries. BPSOS currently collaborates with legal aid and human rights organizations, UN agencies, and US and other embassies in Southeast Asia to promote refugee protection policies, provide legal assistance to victims, and advocate for expeditious resettlement. High-profile cases successfully assisted by BPSOS include Pastor Nguyen Lap Ma, Pastor Nguyen Nhat Thong, Ven. Tim Sakhorn (Buddhist monk) and numerous dissidents.

Monitoring Vietnam's Country Conditions
BPSOS works with a large number of human rights organizations to monitor the developments in Vietnam in different human rights areas, including labor rights, religious freedom, freedom of association, freedom of the press, prison conditions, etc. BPSOS works with International Human Rights Society to maintain the list of dissidents arrested since August 2007, when the ongoing massive government crackdown started. Information collected is published in the annual Vietnam Country Report, which is distributed to members of Congress, relevant Administration agencies, and human rights organizations. BPSOS frequently participates in Congressional hearings on Vietnam and prepares briefs for US officials on issues relating to Vietnam.

For an explanation of the term "boat people" with respect to refugees from the Vietnam War, see the "Vietnamese boat people" article.

Notes

Asian-American culture in Virginia
Vietnamese-American history
Non-profit organizations based in Falls Church, Virginia
Refugee aid organizations in the United States
Charities based in Virginia
Vietnamese diaspora